Noriko Kawamura teaches history at the Washington State University, where she specializes in military history, World War II in the Pacific, and the Cold War and holds the Arnold M. and Atsuko Craft Professor chair.
Her most well-known work specialises in Hirohito and modern Japan.

Education 
Kawamura received a bachelor's degree from Keio University in Japan in 1978.  She received her doctoral degree from the University of Washington in 1989, with major fields in American diplomatic history, Japanese-American relations, and modern Japan.

Career 
Kawamura has served as President of the Asian Studies on the Pacific Coast society.

Works 
Kawamura is currently working on a new book project on Emperor Hirohito's Cold War under contract with the University of Washington Press.
Kawamura, Noriko. Emperor Hirohito and the Pacific War. Seattle; London: University of Washington Press, 2017. 
As editor, Building New Pathways to Peace. Seattle, WA: University of Washington Press, 2015. 
Kawamura, Noriko. Turbulence in the Pacific Japanese-U.S. Relations During World War I. Westport, Conn: Praeger, 2000.

Honours & Awards
Arnold M. and Atsuko Craft Professorship (College of Arts and Sciences, WSU, 2018-2021)
Outstanding Achievement in International Activities (College of Arts and Sciences, WSU, 2016)
Edward R. Meyer Project Grant (College of Arts and Sciences, WSU, 2016)

References 

Living people
University of Washington alumni
Keio University alumni
Historians of Japan
Washington State University faculty
Year of birth missing (living people)